The 1979 Asia Golf Circuit was the 18th season of golf tournaments that comprised the Asia Golf Circuit. Overall prize money on the circuit was US$634,000, with three tournaments boasting a US$100,000 purse.

The Philippine Open was withdrawn from the circuit due to non-payment of contributions towards the overall circuit fund, however the tournament did go ahead but did not count for the circuit standings. Along with Thailand, the Philippines had also not been forthcoming with their contributions the previous season. After the tournament, the Philippines announced their intention to reschedule the Philippine Open to December and possibly rejoining the circuit with the Philippine Masters, as invitational event which had served as warm-up event for the circuit since its inauguration in 1976, however they ultimately rejoined the circuit for the 1980 season with the same tournament schedules.

Taiwan's Lu Hsi-chuen was the overall circuit champion, having won three tournaments during the season.

Tournament schedule
The table below shows the 1979 Asian Golf Circuit schedule. With the traditional curtain raiser, the Philippine Open, being dropped from the circuit, there were only nine tournaments beginning with the Hong Kong Open.

Final standings
The Asia Golf Circuit operated a points based system to determine the overall circuit champion, with points being awarded in each tournament to the leading players. At the end of the season, the player with the most points was declared the circuit champion, and there was a prize pool to be shared between the top players in the points table.

References

Asia Golf Circuit
Asia Golf Circuit